This is a list of sugar manufacturers in Tanzania

 Tanganyika Planting Company Limited

 Kilombero Sugar Company Limited 

 Kagera Sugar Limited
 Mtibwa Sugar Estates Limited
 Mkulazi Holding Company Limited
 Bakhresa Sugar Limited

Output and market share
, the output and market share of each manufacturer is summarized in the table below:

 Totals may be a little off due to rounding.

In May 2017, The East African reported that annual production was at about 320,000 metric tonnes against domestic consumption of about 420,000 metric tonnes. By February 2019, national production was estimated at about 300,000 metric tonnes annually, with national annual consumption of about 670,000 metric tonnes, of which 515,000 metric tonnes were for domestic consumption and the other 155,000 metric tonnes were for industrial use.

As of June 2020, national annual sugar consumption was estimated at 470,000 tonnes, while national sugar production was 378,000 tonnes in 2019. This creates a national sugar deficit of 92,000 tonnes annually.

In June 2021, The Citizen newspaper reported that national sugar output was about 462,900 metric tonnes, with domestic demand of 635,000 metric tonnes annually, creating a deficit of approximately 172,100 metric tonnes every year. Of the 635,000 metric tonnes of annual demand, 470,000 metric tonnes are for domestic sugar and 165,000 metric tonnes are for industrial sugar.

See also
Economy of Tanzania

References

External links
Dar invites Oman to invest in sugar sector

Sugar manufacturers